James Martin Fitzgerald (October 7, 1920 – April 3, 2011) was an American lawyer and judge. He served as an associate justice of the Alaska Supreme Court from 1972 to 1975, and resigned that position when he was appointed to serve as a United States district judge of the United States District Court for the District of Alaska.

Education and career

Born on October 7, 1920, in Portland, Oregon, Fitzgerald was a private in the United States Army from 1940 to 1941. He was a sergeant in the United States Marine Corps from 1942 to 1946. He received a Bachelor of Arts degree in 1950 from Willamette University. He received a Bachelor of Laws in 1951 from Willamette University College of Law. He was an assistant United States attorney for the Alaska Territory district from 1952 to 1956. He was the city attorney for Anchorage, Alaska from 1956 to 1959. He was legal counsel for Governor William A. Egan in 1959. He was the commissioner of public safety for the State of Alaska in 1959. He was a judge of the Third Judicial District of the Alaska Superior Court from 1959 to 1972, serving as presiding judge from 1969 to 1972. He was a justice of the Alaska Supreme Court from 1972 to 1975.

Federal judicial service

On December 2, 1974, Fitzgerald was nominated by President Gerald Ford to be a judge of the United States District Court for the District of Alaska, to a seat vacated by Judge Raymond Eugene Plummer. Fitzgerald was confirmed by the United States Senate on December 18, 1974, and received his commission on December 20, 1974. He served as chief judge from 1984 to 1989 and assumed senior status on January 1, 1989. He stopped hearing cases in 2006, but remained in inactive senior status until his death on April 3, 2011, in Santa Rosa, California.

References

External links
 
 Willamette Lawyer Fall 2004 issue of the Willamette Lawyer magazine, in which numerous Alaskans are profiled, including Fitzgerald.

1920 births
2011 deaths
Alaska state court judges
Justices of the Alaska Supreme Court
Assistant United States Attorneys
Jefferson High School (Portland, Oregon) alumni
Judges of the United States District Court for the District of Alaska
Lawyers from Portland, Oregon
Politicians from Anchorage, Alaska
People from Santa Rosa, California
Superior court judges in the United States
United States Army soldiers
United States district court judges appointed by Gerald Ford
20th-century American judges
United States Marine Corps personnel of World War II
Willamette University alumni
Willamette University College of Law alumni
Lawyers from Anchorage, Alaska